The Chernihiv Oblast Council is the regional oblast council (parliament) of the Chernihiv Oblast (province) located in Northern Ukraine.

Council members are elected for five year terms. In order to gain representation in the council, a party must gain more than 5 percent of the total vote.

Recent elections

2020
Distribution of seats after the 2020 Ukrainian local elections

Election date was 25 October 2020

2015
Distribution of seats after the 2015 Ukrainian local elections

Election date was 25 October 2015

Chairmen

Regional executive committee
 1932–1934 Mykhailo Holubyatnikov
 1934–1937 Solomon Zaher
 1937–1937 Heorhiy Bohatyryov
 1937–1938 ? Sokolov
 1938–1941 Serhiy Kostyuchenko
 1941–1943 World War II
 1943–1949 Serhiy Kostyuchenko
 1949–1950 Vasyl Kapranov
 1950–1959 Leonid Vandenko
 1959–1961 Porfyriy Kumanyok
 1961–1963 Mykola Borysenko
 1963–1964 Borys Horban (industrial)
 1963–1973 Vasyl Zamula (agrarian)
 1973–1981 Viktor Filonenko
 1981–1984 Volodymyr Nikulishchev
 1984–1990 Mykhailo Hryshko
 1990–1992 Oleksandr Lysenko
 1994–1995 Petro Shapoval

Regional council
 1990–1991 Vasyl Lisovenko
 1991–1994 Oleksandr Lysenko
 1994–2001 Petro Shapoval
 2001–2006 Vasyl Kovalyov
 2006–2010 Nataliia Romanova
 2010–2014 Anatoliy Melnyk
 2014–2015 Mykola Zvyeryev
 2015–  Ihor Vdovenko

See also
 Governor of Chernihiv Oblast

References

Council
Regional legislatures of Ukraine
Unicameral legislatures